Alice McKennis Duran (born August 18, 1989) is a former World Cup alpine ski racer from the United States. She specializes in the speed events of downhill and Super-G.

Born in Glenwood Springs, Colorado, McKennis grew up on a ranch west of town, near New Castle. She learned to ski and race at nearby Sunlight Ski Area and after racing for various major clubs in the state, finished at Rowmark ski academy in Salt Lake City, Utah. She made her World Cup debut in December 2008, but spent the 2009 season on the Nor-Am circuit.

McKennis was named to the World Cup squad of the U.S. Ski Team for the 2010 season and also made the 2010 Olympic team. She missed most of the 2011 season due to a fracture to her left tibial plateau in early January. McKennis gained her first World Cup victory (and podium) in 2013, a downhill at St. Anton, Austria, on January 12. She suffered a similar tibial plateau injury to her other (right) knee in March at Garmisch-Partenkirchen, Germany.

World Cup results

Season standings

Race podiums
1 win – (1 DH) 
2 podiums – (2 DH)

World Championship results

Olympic results

References

External links

 
 Alice McKennis World Cup standings at the International Ski Federation
 
 Alice McKennis at the U.S. Ski Team
 
 
 
 Alice McKennis at Head Skis
 

1989 births
Living people
American female alpine skiers
Olympic alpine skiers of the United States
Alpine skiers at the 2010 Winter Olympics
Alpine skiers at the 2018 Winter Olympics
People from Glenwood Springs, Colorado
21st-century American women